Margaret Kobia is a Kenyan who was nominated by President Uhuru Kenyatta as Cabinet Secretary for the Public Service, Youth and Gender Affairs, on 26 January 2018. Prior to her current position, she served as the 
Chairperson of the Kenya Public Service Commission , from December 2012 until January 2018.

Background and education
Margaret was born in the year 1958 in present-day Meru County. Her mother was a farmer and housewife and her father was a police officer. She is the first-born in a family of seven siblings, five sisters and two brothers. Margaret attended Mariinya-A-Ruibi Primary School. She then studied at Alliance Girls High School, which she joined in 1972, for both her O-Level and A-Level education, graduating in 1977.

In 1979, she was admitted to the University of Nairobi, graduating with a Bachelor of Education (BEd) degree. In 1990, she was admitted to Kenyatta University, where she obtained a Master of Education (MEd) degree, specializing in teacher education, in 1991. Later, in 2003, she graduated with a Doctor of Philosophy (PhD) degree, in Human Resource
Education and Entrepreneurship, from the University of Illinois at Urbana–Champaign, where she studied on scholarship.

Career
Right after her first degree, Margaret started teaching at Ngara Girls' High School in 1981. After six years at Ngara, she joined the Kenya National Examinations Council (KNEC) as a research officer and test developer.

In 1992, Margaret was appointed Senior Lecturer in Education at Kenya Science Teachers’ College. Then in 1996, she moved to Kenyatta University as the Acting Deputy Registrar and the Director of the Students’ Welfare Services Board. In 2002, she was appointed Assistant Commission Secretary at the then Commission for Higher Education, now Commission for University Education. She then returned to teaching, at Strathmore University, as a senior lecturer in management, Entrepreneurship and Research Methodology.

In 2005, Kobia was appointed the director, Kenya Institute of Administration (KIA), now Kenya School of Government, serving in that capacity until 2012, when she was appointed the chairperson of the Kenya Public Service Commission, the first Kenyan woman to serve in that position.

Family
Margaret Kobia a married mother of three children, one son and two daughters.

Other considerations
Professor Margaret Kobia has received a number of awards,  including the "Order of Grand Warrior" (OGW), the order of
"Chief of Burning Spear" (CBS) and the "Commonwealth Gordon Draper Award". She was elected as the Vice President and board member of the Commonwealth Association of Public Administration and Management (CAPAM), in October 2014. She is a fellow at
the Kenya Institute of Management and at the Institute of Certified Public Secretaries of Kenya.

See also
 Amina Mohamed
 Raychelle Omamo
 Judy Wakhungu

References

External links
Website of the Kenya Ministry of Public Service, Youth and Gender Affairs

Living people
1958 births
University of Nairobi alumni
Kenyatta University alumni
Kenyan politicians
21st-century Kenyan women politicians
21st-century Kenyan politicians
Academic staff of Kenyatta University
People from Meru County
Academic staff of Strathmore University